John Fralic Carroll (31 July 1930 – 1 April 1997) was a Canadian sprinter. He competed in the men's 400 metres at the 1952 Summer Olympics.

References

1930 births
1997 deaths
Athletes (track and field) at the 1952 Summer Olympics
Canadian male sprinters
Olympic track and field athletes of Canada
Athletes from Montreal
Anglophone Quebec people
Michigan Wolverines men's track and field athletes